Saint-Paul-en-Born is a commune in the Landes department in Nouvelle-Aquitaine in southwestern France.

Population

References

Communes of Landes (department)